Jan Polák (born 14 March 1981) is a retired Czech international footballer who played as a midfielder.

Career
In his younger days he played for FC Zbrojovka Brno and Tatran Bohunice. Formerly a member of the Czech national under-21 side, Polák, alongside players like Petr Čech and Milan Baroš, was a part of the team which won the European Under-21 Football Championship in 2002. He also holds the record for the most appearances for the Czech Republic under-21 team.

In 2005, he was transferred from the Czech Premier League team FC Slovan Liberec for a fee of €1,500,000 to the Bundesliga side 1. FC Nürnberg. In the same year he played for the first time under Czech national coach Karel Brückner.

On 3 August 2007, Anderlecht bought Polák. He was given number 8. The Czech international reportedly cost €3.5 million and was at the time the second most expensive transfer in Anderlecht's history, as well as one of the highest paid players in Belgian football. He was Anderlecht's box-to-box midfielder playing a crucial role in their 2007–08 Jupiler League season and the 2007–08 UEFA Cup.

Honours 
1. FC Nürnberg
 DFB-Pokal: 2006–07

Anderlecht
 Belgian First Division: 2009–10
 Belgian Cup: 2007–08
 Belgian Super Cup: 2010

References

External links 
 
 
 

1981 births
Living people
Czech footballers
Czech Republic under-21 international footballers
Czech Republic youth international footballers
2006 FIFA World Cup players
FC Zbrojovka Brno players
FC Slovan Liberec players
Expatriate footballers in Germany
1. FC Nürnberg players
R.S.C. Anderlecht players
VfL Wolfsburg players
Footballers at the 2000 Summer Olympics
Olympic footballers of the Czech Republic
Czech Republic international footballers
Czech expatriate footballers
Bundesliga players
Czech First League players
Sportspeople from Brno
Belgian Pro League players
UEFA Euro 2008 players
Expatriate footballers in Belgium
Association football midfielders
Czech expatriate sportspeople in Germany
Czech expatriate sportspeople in Belgium